Paul Porter (born c. 1954) is an American public address announcer best known for his work for the Orlando Magic of the NBA, and the Tampa Bay Lightning of the National Hockey League.

Porter has served as the arena voice for the Magic since the team's inception in the late 1980s. In addition, Porter was the former public address announcer of the Cleveland Cavaliers from 1980 to 1984. He was also the arena voice of NBA All-Star games in 1981 in Cleveland and both 1992 and 2012 in Orlando.

Porter was the PA announcer of the Arena Football League's Tampa Bay Storm until the team ceased operations in December, 2017. 

Porter is a native of Cleveland and currently resides in Tampa, Florida.

References

External links
Porter bio
2003 Porter article feature
Cleveland Plain Dealer interview
Video of Porter discussing top three moments in Magic history
Magic game night staff

Living people
American sports announcers
Orlando Magic
National Basketball Association public address announcers
National Hockey League public address announcers
Sportspeople from Cleveland
Cleveland Cavaliers
Tampa Bay Lightning
Tampa Bay Storm
People from Tampa, Florida
Year of birth missing (living people)